Jeremy Levin (born 1954) is a South African-born businessman, medical doctor and research scientist. In 2018, Levin was named as one of the most influential figures in the biopharmaceutical industry.

Biography
Jeremy Levin was born in South Africa, where his family had a farm, De Hoek Farm, in Piketberg, Western Cape. His father Archie (died 1977) was a political journalist. His mother, Leah Levin OBE, is Hon. Doctor of the University of Essex. She served on the board of the United Nations Association, Anti-Slavery and International Alert, and was director of JUSTICE from 1982 to 1992. Ms. Levin also served on Boards of Redress, Readers International, and the International Journal of Human Rights. She is the author of UNESCO's "Human Rights: Questions and Answers," one the world's widely disseminated books on human rights.  He is the brother of David and sister Michal Levin.

Following the Sharpeville massacre, his family left South Africa and moved to live in Salisbury, Rhodesia (now Harare, Zimbabwe). In 1965, his father was given a day to leave the country. The family arrived in Britain knowing nobody, settling in London. He attended Holland Park School. Following graduating from high school, Levin went to Wadham College, University of Oxford, where he gained a First Class BA Honors degree in zoology, and a Master of Arts (MA) and doctorate (DPhil) in cell biology and chromatin structure from the Oxford University's Sir William Dunn School of Pathology. He subsequently received an MB, BChir degree (Bachelor of Medicine, Bachelor of Surgery) from the University of Cambridge. 

Prior to his business experience Levin practised medicine, working at university hospitals including the Hammersmith Hospital in London, Groote Schuur in Cape Town, South Africa and Hôpitaux universitaires de Genève, Geneva, Switzerland. 

In 1986, Levin came to America where he has worked in the biopharmaceutical industry in progressively senior positions. While living in Washington, D.C. Levin met Margery Feldberg (daughter of Stanley Feldberg, co-founder of TJX Companies). They married in September 1987 and have two daughters. He has lived in New Milford since the 1980s, where he and his wife own De Hoek Farm, raising Black Angus cows.

Business career
Levin is the chairman and CEO of Ovid Therapeutics Inc., a company dedicated to providing innovative medicines to children and adults with neurological disorders. Ovid's initial product development programs are focused on orphan and rare diseases of the brain, including Angelman syndrome and Fragile X syndrome.

Prior to joining Ovid, Levin served as president and CEO of Israel's Teva Pharmaceutical Industries Ltd. (NYSE:TEVA), one of the world's largest pharmaceutical companies. Previously, he was a member of the executive committee of Bristol-Myers Squibb (NYSE:BMY), where he had global responsibilities for strategy, alliances and transactions. In this role, he devised and led BMY's “String of Pearls” business development strategy. This strategy helped drive the transformation of BMY, particularly following the acquisition by Levin of Medarex Inc. in July 2009, which positioned BMY as a leader in immunooncology. Prior to this, Levin was head of global business development and strategic alliances at Novartis (NYSE: NVS), and previously served as chairman and CEO of Cadus Pharmaceuticals, Inc.

Levin currently serves on the board of H. Lundbeck A/S and in 2019 was elected as the chairman of the Biotechnology Innovation Organization (BIO).

Levin is a frequent speaker at biopharmaceutical conferences, where his focus is driving deeper and more direct relationships between companies and patients, ensuring innovation in the biopharmaceutical industry, expanding the role of mergers and acquisitions, globalising the biopharmaceutical industry, and propelling interface of the digital health and biopharmaceutical industries and leadership.

Awards and recognition
Levin is the recipient of a number of awards, including:

FierceBiotech's one of the most influential people in biopharma
The Kermode Prize for work on novel hypertension drugs
The Albert Einstein Award for Leadership in Life Sciences
The B'nai B'rith Award for Distinguished Achievement for commitment to improving global health care
The Officer's Cross of the Order of Merit of the Republic of Hungary

References

British businesspeople
Living people
Israeli businesspeople
Israeli Jews
20th-century American Jews
Businesspeople from New York (state)
British Jews
South African Jews
1954 births
People educated at Holland Park School
20th-century American businesspeople
21st-century American Jews